José Cardel is a city in the Mexican state of Veracruz.
It serves as the municipal seat for the surrounding municipality of 
La Antigua.

Populated places in Veracruz